The British Gynaecological Cancer Society (BGCS) is a society of medical professionals who seek to improve the care provided to gynaecological cancer patients. The society describes its mission as being "to advance the science and art of gynaecological oncology for the benefit of the public."

See also 
 Cancer in the United Kingdom

References

External links
Constitution
Official website

Cancer organisations based in the United Kingdom
Medical associations based in the United Kingdom